William Mark Tosheff (June 2, 1926 – October 1, 2011) was an American professional basketball player.

A 6'1" guard, Tosheff played at Indiana University from 1947 to 1951 after a stint with the U.S. Army Air Corps. From 1951 to 1954, he played in the NBA as a member of the Indianapolis Olympians and Milwaukee Hawks, averaging 9.2 points in 203 games. Some sources list him as the 1952 NBA Co-Rookie of the Year (with Mel Hutchins); however, official NBA guides generally have not included pre-1953 winners.

In 1988, Tosheff founded the Pre-1965 NBA Players Association in order to secure fair pension plans for NBA players who were active before 1965. Tosheff lobbied to close a loophole in the NBA pension that granted benefits to post-1965 players with a minimum of three years of service, but required pre-1965 players have five years of service.

A San Diego resident, Tosheff died in Hawaii from cancer aged 85 on October 1, 2011.

References

1926 births
2011 deaths
American men's basketball players
Basketball players from Gary, Indiana
Basketball players from San Diego
Deaths from cancer in Hawaii
Indiana Hoosiers men's basketball players
Indianapolis Olympians draft picks
Indianapolis Olympians players
Milwaukee Hawks players
Point guards
Shooting guards